Althenia australis is a species of aquatic plant in the family Potamogetonaceae. It is found in fresh to brackish waters in Australia. This species has been transferred from Lepilaena.

References

External links
Flora of Western Australia

Potamogetonaceae
Taxa named by James Drummond (botanist)
Taxa named by William Henry Harvey
Taxa named by Paul Friedrich August Ascherson